Polyphylla fullo  is a beetle belonging to the family Scarabaeidae, subfamily Melolonthinae.

Description
Polyphylla fullo is the largest of the European Melolonthinae, attaining a length of 38 mm. The body is robust and convex and more or less reddish brown or blackish. It is covered with fine white pubescence which forms marbled spots. Like other members of the genus, males possess an enlarged antennal "fan", which gives a distinctive appearance to these beetles, and gave rise to the scientific name for the genus (Polyphylla = "many leaves"). The adult lives and feed on the foliage of pines, while the larvae live on the roots of grasses and sedges (Graminaceae and Cyperaceae).

Distribution
Polyphylla fullo is found in North Africa, Europe and middle east. It occurs most frequently in central and southern Europe, but it is almost everywhere rare. Its northern boundary is the south of Sweden, the eastern Balkans, the Caucasus and east of Iran.

It inhabits sandy environments, such as the edge of a sunny pine forests, vineyards, or dunes.

Gallery

References

External links
Funet
Polyphylla fullo

Polyphylla
Beetles described in 1758
Taxa named by Carl Linnaeus